The Professional Doctor of Diplomacy or Professional Doctor of Diplomatic Studies (abbreviated DDiplomacy or DDipl) is an equivalent award to a PhD. It is a taught doctoral programme designed for working professionals in the area of diplomacy and multilateral diplomacy or for those wishing to pursue a career in international relations. The programme focuses on applied theories and concepts which bring relevancy and day-to-day practice into the learning environment. The concept of a professional doctorate in diplomacy was first devised by The London Academy of Diplomacy in 2014 to help professionals make sense of their experiences and to develop their skills and competencies as practising diplomats. Besides undertaking studies in specialist subjects, students finish with a work-based project or applied research thesis which makes a direct contribution to diplomatic practice.

Purpose of a Professional Doctorate of Diplomacy 
The role and responsibilities of diplomats has changed dramatically in recent years and has become something more than the diplomacy of states and governments. Globalisation, international trade developments, and our increasing interdependencies – not to mention dramatic shifts in the balance of power – mean that today’s diplomat needs to have at his/her finger tips a vast amount of knowledge and an array of skills that is unprecedented. This requires a new way of thinking about how to train diplomats
Designed with the working professional in mind, the Professional Doctor of Diplomacy programme is especially designed to align professional competence with academic principles and to develop transferable skills to meet the needs of today’s diplomat.  The aim of the taught doctorate in diplomacy is to find fresh approaches of integrating professional practice and academic knowledge, and to produce a qualification which, whilst being equivalent in status and challenge to a PhD, is more appropriate for working professionals and those pursuing professional rather than academic careers.

Contribution, Inquiry and Research 

Students make a significant contribution to the advancement of knowledge in the diplomatic field while studying part-time and remaining at work. Choosing a taught doctorate in diplomacy over a PhD brings a day-to-day relevancy of applied learning to problem solving, applying theory to diplomatic issues compared with a PhD that aims to create new knowledge. However, students undertaking a professional taught doctorate are expected to make a contribution to both theory and practice in their field. They work collaboratively with faculty and practitioners from the field to study a contemporary problem in diplomacy. Bringing together a strong combination of experiences and perspectives to understanding the problem, the student’s work culminates in developing professional practice by making a contribution to professional competence/knowledge. Therefore, the professional Doctor of Diplomacy programme has the three-fold purpose of: (1) contributing to both theory and practice in relation to diplomacy; (2) developing professional competence in the field of diplomacy; and (3) contributing to professional knowledge. The degree is conferred when all coursework and written research are completed and reviewed and approved by Stirling University, the awarding institution.

Suitability, Enrolment and Admission 
Typical entry requirements include PhDs, master's degrees, or equivalent qualifications in a functional field awarded by a professional body. Significant experience is also required. Therefore, typical candidates are:

 Ambassadors
 Heads of mission
 Heads of Protocol
 Heads of NGOs
 Directors from Organisations such as WTO, Red Cross, UNESCO, etc.
 Ministers & Assistant Ministers from ministries of Foreign Affairs, Interior, Environment, etc.
 Members of Think Tanks

Candidates, having already risen to a senior position in their field, undertake the programme to gain a higher level of reflective personal development rather than with the expectation of immediate career advancement (as with perhaps a DBA). For career diplomats, the Doctor of Diplomacy qualification is seen as a positive summation of their professional development.

Structure and format 
Providing a part-time structure of rigorous, concentrated study, ongoing research practice and continual, practical assessment, the course combines distance learning with the advantages of face-to-face study. The Professional Doctor of Diplomacy is designed to fit into a busy schedule whilst ensuring that students have the support and guidance needed to help translate their knowledge and experience into proper academic thinking and writing.
The taught element of the programme consists of six face-to-face modules taken over two years when students get to meet, network and share ideas. In the third year, DDipl candidates will then specialise in areas such as cross-border and cyber security, diplomacy of the global economic system, failed states and civil conflicts, human security risks, during the project phase of the course. According to the European higher education standards set by the Bologna Process, it is stated that the normal duration of a doctorate should correspond to 3–4 years of full-time study. A highly experienced practitioner candidate should be able to complete this taught doctorate within that time-frame.

References

External links 
 
 

Doctoral degrees